The Lira gas field natural gas field is located on the continental shelf of the Black Sea. It was discovered in 2016 and developed by Lukoil and Romgaz. The total proven reserves of the Lira gas field are around 1.11 trillion cubic feet (32 km3). This gas discovery is the second largest in the Romanian sector of the Black Sea after Petrom and ExxonMobil's Domino gas field.

References

Natural gas fields in Romania
Black Sea energy